The 1994 Australian Open was a professional non-ranking snooker tournament that took place between 1–7 August 1994 at the Bentleigh Club in Melbourne, Australia.

John Higgins won the tournament by defeating Willie Thorne 9–5 in the final.


Main draw

References

Australian Goldfields Open
1994 in Australian sport
1994 in snooker